Gerard Russell (1620–1682), of Fordham Abbey, Fordham, Cambridgeshire, was an English politician.

Family
Russell was the son of Sir William Russell, 1st Baronet, of Chippenham.

Career
He was a Member (MP) of the Parliament of England for Cambridgeshire in March 1679.

References

1620 births
1682 deaths
People from East Cambridgeshire District
English MPs 1679